Cuproxena paramplana is a species of moth of the family Tortricidae. It is found in Morona-Santiago Province, Ecuador.

The wingspan is 21.5 mm. The ground colour of the forewings is pale ochreous cream with a weak brownish admixture and spots at the dorsum. The hindwings are ochreous cream, but paler basally.

Etymology
The species name refers to similarity with Cuproxena amplana and is derived from its name and the Greek prefix para (meaning near to).

References

Moths described in 2007
Cuproxena
Moths of South America
Taxa named by Józef Razowski